The N763 is a regional road in Limburg. The road has a length of about 8 kilometers.

References 

763